Coscarelli is an Italian surname. It is mostly found in Calabria and a high concentration of inhabitants called Coscarelli are located in the Province of Cosenza. Notable people with the surname include:

 Erin Coscarelli, American anchor
 Don Coscarelli, American film director, producer and screenwriter 
 Chloe Coscarelli, vegan chef and author
 Melina Coscarelli, PhD., Neuro Psychologist
 Michael Coscarelli, Entrepreneur 
 Katrina Coscarelli, Regional Sales Direct for Toyota.

References

External links
L'Italia dei cognomi Gens.labo.net
Dissemination of the surname COSCARELLI in Calabria 
Coscarelli on locatemyname.com

Surnames of Italian origin